Defalcation is misappropriation of funds by a person trusted with their charge; also, the act of misappropriation, or an instance thereof. The term is more specifically used by the United States Bankruptcy Code to describe a category of acts that taint a particular debt such that it cannot be discharged in bankruptcy. The United States Supreme Court addressed the issue in 2013, holding that "defalcation" in the context of the U.S. Bankruptcy Code  requires proof of "a culpable state of mind… involving knowledge of, or gross recklessness in respect to, the improper nature of the relevant fiduciary behavior."

In accounting terminology, especially with respect to the area of audit, defalcation means a misappropriation of assets or theft of assets by employees or officers of a corporation.

Defalcation occurs when a debtor commits a bad act while acting in a fiduciary capacity. The classic example of defalcation is when a trustee recklessly invests trust funds and loses the money. If the beneficiary wins a judgment against the trustee, and the trustee files for bankruptcy, the debt (the judgment) cannot be discharged in bankruptcy because the debt was the result of a defalcation.

Defalcation, for example, applies when a debtor is acting in a fiduciary capacity.  To constitute a defalcation, the conduct involves a degree of culpability that is greater than negligence, but the act does not need to rise to the level of a "fraud" under common law. Defalcation requires showing of conscious behavior or extreme recklessness.

The term is used in legal proceedings other than bankruptcy to refer more generally to embezzlement; it is often used in the context of the title insurance business.  A title agent who misuses funds intended to be used to close insured transactions is said to be involved in a defalcation. Many title insurers have their own "defalcation units"

Sometimes defalcation has been pronounced for very small amounts as under 2 £ and cents, even if it was claimed to be an error in handling change.

Etymology

The term is from Latin, and is analyzed as de- "off" + falx "sickle" + -atio "act of", hence literally "cutting off with a sickle". There is also a verb form, "defalcate".

References

United States bankruptcy law
Legal terminology